Kindia is a prefecture located in the Kindia Region of Guinea. The capital is Kindia. The prefecture covers an area of 9,648 km.² with a population of 439,614.

Sub-prefectures
The prefecture is divided administratively into 10 sub-prefectures:
 Kindia-Centre
 Bangouyah
 Damankanyah
 Friguiagbé
 Kolenté
 Madina-Oula
 Mambia
 Molota
 Samayah
 Souguéta

Prefectures of Guinea
Kindia Region